Ventrifilosa is a highly diverse group of phagotrophic protists that glide through their flagella and emit filose pseudopods from their ventral side for feeding. Because of their mixture of amoeba and flagellate characteristics, they are amoeboflagellates. Members of this group are the Imbricatea, Sarcomonadea and Thecofilosea.

Morphology
Protists in the group Ventrifilosa ancestrally have a rigid extracellular theca on the dorsal side, and emit non-granular filose pseudopods from a ventral aperture. This aperture is called "cleft" when belonging to an amoeboflagellate, or "astropyle" when belonging to a phaeodarian.

The group includes descendants that have lost or modified some of these characteristics. For example, some have lost their pseudopods (such as the spongomonads and Ebria), some have lost their theca (such as Pseudopirsonia), and some have acquired axopodia (in Phaeodaria). The loss of flagella and scales has occurred in this group several times independently through evolution.

Taxonomy
The superclass Ventrifilosa was first described in 2012 by Cavalier-Smith to unite Thecofilosea and Imbricatea. However, the group proved to be polyphyletic because the sarcomonads were excluded. Later, in 2018, it was expanded to include Sarcomonadea, which belonged to the superclass Eoglissa before this change.

The current classification of Ventrifilosa recognizes 3 classes, 20 orders and 60 families.

Class Sarcomonadea 
?Family Katabiidae 
Subclass Paracercomonada 
Order Paracercomonadida 
Subclass Pediglissa 
Order Cercomonadida 
Order Glissomonadida 
Class Imbricatea 
Subclass Placonuda 
Superorder Nudisarca 
Order Variglissida 
Order Marimonadida 
Superorder Euglyphia 
Order Euglyphida 
Order Zoelucasida 
Superorder Discomonada 
Order Discomonadida 
Subclass Placoperla 
Superorder Placofila 
Order Thaumatomonadida 
Order Discocelida 
Superorder Perlatia 
Order Spongomonadida 
Order Perlofilida 
Subclass Krakenia 
Order Krakenida 
Class Thecofilosea 
Subclass Ventricleftia 
Order Ventricleftida 
Subclass Eothecia 
Order Matazida 
Order Ebriida 
Order Cryomonadida 
Subclass Phaeodaria 
Order Eodarida 
Order Opaloconchida 
Subclass Tectosia 
Order Tectofilosida

References

Cercozoa